Jean Auguste Berthaut (29 March 1817 – 24 December 1881) was a French soldier and politician.

He graduated from Saint Cyr in 1837.  He was promoted to Brigadier general July 1870.

He commanded the National Guard in Paris in 1870.  He fought at the Battle of Le Bourget, Champagny, and Battle of Buzenval.
He was appointed Minister of War, in the government of Jules Dufaure.
He was appointed commander of the 18th Army Corps.
He was a grand officer of the Legion of Honor.

References

1817 births
1881 deaths
People from Côte-d'Or
French generals
French Ministers of War
Politicians of the French Third Republic
French military personnel of the Franco-Prussian War
Grand Officiers of the Légion d'honneur